The Opatov Photovoltaics Plant a photovoltaic power station in the Czech Republic commissioned in 2006. It has an installed capacity of 60 kW. It was shortly the largest photovoltaic plant in the country.

References

Photovoltaic power stations in the Czech Republic